Right Beside You may refer to:

 Right Beside You (Sophie B. Hawkins song)
 Right Beside You (Jakwob song)
 Right Beside You, a song by Building 429 from the album Listen to the Sound
 Right Beside You a 2016 album by Jeff White